William M. Kelso, C.B.E., Ph. D., F.S.A. (born 1941), often referred to as Bill Kelso, is an American archaeologist specializing in Virginia's colonial period, particularly the Jamestown colony.

Personal life
A native of Lakeside, Ohio, Kelso earned a B.A. in History from Baldwin-Wallace College, an M.A. in Early American History from the College of William and Mary, and a Ph.D in Historical Archaeology from Emory University.

Career
He has served as director of archaeology at Carter's Grove, Monticello, and Poplar Forest, as well as Commissioner of Archaeology for the Virginia Historic Landmarks Commission.  During his time at Monticello, he was one of the first to make early colonial slave life the focus of archaeological research.  Currently he serves as the Director of Research and Interpretation for the Preservation Virginia Jamestown Rediscovery project.

Rediscovery of Jamestown
In 1994, Kelso began directing excavations on Jamestown Island at the behest of Preservation Virginia. It was not long before the Jamestown Rediscovery archaeologists uncovered the footprint of the fort's southern palisade. His 2004 book  includes an in-depth study of the features uncovered during the excavations.

Published works
Kingsmill Plantations, 1619-1800: Archaeology of Country Life in Colonial Virginia.  Charlottesville: University of Virginia Press, 1984.
(with J. Deetz) Archaeology at Monticello. Chapel Hill: University of North Carolina Press, 2002.
(with B. Straube) Jamestown Rediscovery: 1994-2004.  Richmond: APVA Preservation Virginia, 2004.
Jamestown: The Buried Truth. Charlottesville: University of Virginia Press, 2006.

Awards
In 2007 Kelso received the J. C. Harrington Award, presented by the Society for Historical Archaeology for his life-time contributions to archaeology centered on scholarship. In July, 2012, as a result of his work on Jamestown Island, he was awarded an Honorary Commander of the Most Excellent Order of the British Empire at the British Embassy in Washington, D.C on behalf of Queen Elizabeth II, whom he had escorted on her visit to Jamestown.

References

External links 

 Encyclopedia of Baldwin Wallace History: Bill Kelso

College of William & Mary faculty
1941 births
Living people
College of William & Mary alumni
Emory University alumni
Baldwin Wallace University alumni
20th-century American archaeologists
21st-century American archaeologists
People from Ottawa County, Ohio
Historians from Ohio